Hamiduzzaman Khan (born ) is a Bangladeshi artist and sculptor. He is well known as a sculptor for his theme and form oriented sculptures, in particular sculptures on the theme of Bangladesh War of Liberation and birds. Following the introduction of modernity in sculpture in Bangladesh in the 1950s by Novera Ahmed, Khan was instrumental in the popularization of sculpture in the country through his distinctive form of modernity. Influenced by Alberto Giacometti and Henry Moore, his works manifest expressionism, minimalism, and a constant exploration of purity of material. He worked on both figurative as well as abstract genres.

In addition to sculpture, Khan is notable as a painter. Even before becoming a sculptor, he gained recognition for his watercolor and acrylic paintings in the late 1960s. Zainul Abedin, the founding father of Bangladeshi modern art, acclaimed and encouraged Khan for his watercolors. His watercolors are characterized by abstract expressionism and predominantly on the subjects of natural landscape and human figure.

For his contribution to sculpture, Khan was awarded Ekushey Padak, the second-highest civilian award in Bangladesh, in 2006. In a career spanning over five decades, his works have been exhibited and installed in Bangladesh, South Korea, India, and the United States.

Early life and education
Khan was born in 1946 in the village Sahasram in Kishoreganj. Indian artist Hemen Majumdar hailed from Gachihata, a neighboring village of Sahasram. Khan used to visit his house as a young boy. His early education was in his native village schools and he completed matriculation in 1962. He then got admitted in the erstwhile East Pakistan College of Arts and Crafts (now Faculty of Fine Arts, University of Dhaka). At the College of Arts and Crafts, he studied under the guidance of artists Zainul Abedin, Safiuddin Ahmed, Aminul Islam, Mustafa Manwar. Zainul Abedin appreciated and encouraged Khan for his watercolor paintings. While he was a third-year student, Abedin presented one of Khan's paintings to the President of Burma, Ne Win, during his visit to the art college. He received Bachelor of Fine Arts degree in 1967 from the Department of Painting and Drawing. Khan was one of the few early students of the college who took interest in sculpture, but there was no opportunity of taking sculpture as a formal subject as an undergraduate in the college. Meanwhile, the college had established the Department of Sculpture and Modeling with Abdur Razzaque as its founding head.

Accident and visit to Europe
When Khan was a student in the final year class, he experienced a road accident that fractured his skull, causing him to have a reconstructive surgery in the head. However, he could sit for the final examination in time. As there was no facility for the surgery in Dhaka, he was advised to receive treatment from the Western General Hospital in Edinburgh. After graduation, he set out for Scotland by ship. This was a turning point in Khan's career. On the way, Khan was impressed by seeing traditional African carvings and masks in Dakar, and rocky shores in Cape Town at stopovers. Following the surgery, at the advice of the doctors, he stayed around in the United Kingdom for some time for total healing of the surgery. During this stay in Edinburgh, he visited the National Museum of Scotland and was impressed by  Henry Moore's sculptures in public places. Then he visited London, experienced artworks at the British Museum, Victoria and Albert Museum, National Gallery, Tate Galleries and was fascinated by landscape paintings by John Constable. Khan was particularly fascinated by modern abstract forms in sculpture, large scale application of sculpture in enhancing the aesthetic quality of urban landscape and its impact in civic life. In Italy, he experienced artworks at the St. Peter's Basilica, the Sistine Chapel ceiling, Pietà by Michelangelo. In Paris, he visited the Louvre and saw works by artists Henri Matisse, Picasso and Auguste Rodin. Sculptures installed in public spaces in Montmartre, Montparnasse and a solo exhibition of Alberto Giacometti have had a lasting impact in his mind. On his return to Dhaka in 1969, Khan decided to specialize in sculpture and requested Abdur Razzaque to teach him sculpture. He worked with Razzaque for six months.

Studies in India and USA
Khan was awarded an Indian Government scholarship in 1974 to study for a Master of Fine Arts degree. He then went on to study at the Faculty of Fine Arts, Maharaja Sayajirao University of Baroda, earning his master's degree in bronze casting in 1976. At Baroda, he studied in the tutelage of notable contemporary Indian artists Raghav Kaneria, Mahendra Pandia, Sankho Chaudhuri, K. G. Subramanyan. During his stay in Baroda as a student, he participated in the exhibition commemorating the twenty-fifth anniversary of Faculty of Fine Arts, University of Baroda. His works included two sculptures made of bronze and one made of plaster—all depicting the terrible experiences of the Bangladesh War of Liberation. Khan was praised by artist M. F. Husain and was awarded first prize for his work.

He went to the United States and received training in metal casting at the Sculpture Center School in New York City from 1982 to 1983. He was influenced by Henry Moor's work, when he visited an exhibition of Moor in New York City. In 1983, the Embassy of Bangladesh in Washington D.C. organized a solo exhibition of Khan with the sculptures he made during his stay in New York City.

Career

Prior to focusing on sculpture, Khan supplemented his income through watercolor paintings. When he was a student in the Institute of Fine Arts, the then principal of the institute Zainul Abedin bought Khan's paintings. An exhibition with his watercolor paintings, done in the period from 1963 to 1969, was held in Chittagong Club in 1969. All the paintings from the exhibition were sold to Chittagong Club and, the earning helped him for his treatment abroad. In 1982, the World Bank bought three of his paintings for interior decoration of the World Bank Headquarters in Washington D.C.

Beginnings
Khan joined the Department of Sculpture, University of Dhaka as a lecturer in August, 1970. Soon began the War of Liberation of the country in March 1971. He had to face interrogation by the Pakistan Armed Forces but was left unharmed. Two days after the army crackdown in Dhaka on 25 March, he went to the New Market area and saw many dead bodies lying unattended. The ghastly scenes and atrocities of the war made permanent impressions in his mind, resulting in his series of works on the theme titled Remembrance ‘71. The victims and the martyrs of the war remained a recurring theme in his imagery in the first two decades following the emergence of Bangladesh in 1971. He worked with his teacher Abdur Razzaque, in the first-ever commissioned sculptural work on the liberation war theme 1972. The piece, titled Jagroto Chowrongi (The Vigilant Crossroads) is the figure of a lone freedom fighter, has become a symbol of the heroic War of Liberation in the country.  
   
He presented sculptures, made with bronze, on the theme Remembrance ’71, in the first-ever National Sculpture Exhibition organized by the Bangladesh Shilpakala Academy in December 1976. He received the Best Sculptor’s Award at the exhibition for his sculpture ‘’Dorja (door)’’. It portrayed the image of a house-door with a martyred figure lying in the doorstep.

1980s and 1990s
Khan’s major recognition as a sculptor came in 1980 when he was commissioned by the Government of Bangladesh to make a sculpture to be installed at the entrance of the Bangabhaban (President’s House). For this commission, he created a sculpture, titled The Bird Family, composed of three standing birds and made of brass sheets, pipes and marble. Initially, the ministers did not like his sculpture and said that it would be displaced. Later, the French ambassador to Bangladesh, while visiting Bangabhaban, notified the then-president Ziaur Rahman that it was contemporary with the sculptures of France. Following the incident, the government officials invited Khan to Bangabhaban and praised his work.

In 1981, he was commissioned by Bangladesh Army to make a sculpture for the Jalalabad Cantonment in Sylhet. The sculpture he made was titled Hamla (Onslaught), based on the theme freedom fighter. In 1985, he created another sculpture on the same theme for the Bangla Academy. Khan organized his first solo sculpture exhibition at the gallery of Faculty of Fine Arts in 1982, with works primarily based on the liberation war theme. The exhibition drew a large number of viewers and received appreciation from critics and connoisseurs. He participated in 6th Triennial Art Exhibition in New Delhi, organized by Lalit Kala Akademi in 1986, as an official entrant from Bangladesh. He organized a solo sculpture exhibition at the Alliance Française de Dhaka in 1987. Bangladesh Shilpakala Academy awarded him Best Sculptor's Award for his work at the National Sculpture Exhibition in 1987. In 1988, his sculpture on the liberation war theme titled Jagrotobangla (The Vigilant Bangla) was installed at the Zia Fertilizer Factory in Ashuganj, Brahmanbaria. It was made of reinforced concrete and marble, symbolizing the hand of a freedom fighter with a rifle.

Khan received his first major international recognition when he was invited by the Olympic Committee in Seoul, Republic of Korea in 1988 to install an open-air sculpture at the Seoul Olympic Park. The sculpture was titled Steps, made of welded copper with a height of 13 feet. It symbolized steps to freedom and progress. In 1990, he received a commission from Jahangirnagar University to install a sculpture in front of the Central Library of the university. The title of the sculpture was Shangshaptak. Made of steel armature and brass steel, it depicted a freedom fighter, having an amputated leg and an amputated hand, charging ahead fearlessly. This remains one of Khan’s best-known works. The figure has later been recast in modified form and in different media to be placed at different locations in Bangladesh. The most prominent one of these is the sculpture titled Freedom Fighter, made with stainless steel pipe which was installed in 2003 at the entrance of UTC Building located in Panthapath, Dhaka. He was invited at the Puyo International Modern Sculpture Symposium in Korea in 1999. For this symposium, he created a 10-feet high sculpture in steel sheet which was exhibited at the Puyo Bodrek Park. He created a sculpture, titled Muktijoddha (The Freedom  Fighter) for the Mymensingh Cantonment in 1999.

From 2000 to present
Khan became a Professor at the Department of Sculpture, University of Dhaka in 2000. In 2001, he created a sculpture, composed of a group of freedom fighters, titled Bijoy Keton which was installed in the Dhaka Cantonment.  In 2004, he created a sculpture titled Birds, which was a delineation of birds in abstract forms, and was placed at the entrance of United Bhaban in Gulshan, Dhaka. In the same year, the World Bank Bangladesh Country Office installed Khan’s sculpture in the atrium of its office in Dhaka. The work consists of three similar forms, depicting birds in abstraction. In addition to that, the World Bank office installed his relief work at the entrance, decorated the interior with 18 of his oil-paintings, terracotta, a metal-sculpture highlighting fish and a mural.  
 
Dhaka City Corporation commissioned Khan in 2005 to create a sculpture to be placed at Farmgate intersection in Dhaka. The piece was titled Fish, which depicts three fishes in spontaneous posture. The work remains as a popular artwork in public space in the busy neighborhood of Dhaka. Khan’s two sculptures in metal adorn the lawns of Bangabandhu Sheikh Mujibur Rahman Novo Theatre. One is a nearly man height abstract arch in deep blue and the other is a hard-edge semi-abstract seated bird in red. His sculpture, titled Shikha, a geometric abstract in painted sheet metal was placed at the entrance of the National University, Bangladesh. It has a height of 32 feet and a width of 13 feet and symbolizes enlightenment through education.

He created a sculpture, titled Peace Bird, on the theme of birds at the request of students of the University of Dhaka. It has been installed in front of the Teacher-Student Centre in 2007, and depicts a group of birds in different postures in abstract form. He published a book in 2007, titled Rose Garden, containing illustrations of the historic Rose Garden Palace in pen-and-ink, crayon and watercolor. In 2011, he was commissioned by Bangladesh Bank to install a sculpture at the premises of Bangladesh Bank headquarters in Motijheel. The work was titled Unity. It was a 32-feet stainless steel sculpture, featuring two hands in abstract form holding together a globe.

Khan retired from the University of Dhaka in 2012. He continues to teach sculpture at several universities in Dhaka. Bangladesh National Museum organized an exhibition of Khan in 2017, titled Hamiduzzaman Khan Retrospective, which displayed over 300 sculptural pieces and 25 paintings spanning his career between 1964 and 2017. As of 2017, 25 solo exhibitions of Khan have been held. In 2019, the Hamiduzzaman Sculpture Park was inaugurated. In a career spanning more than four decades, he has created over 150 sculptures which are located in his home-country Bangladesh and abroad.

Style
Khan’s sculptural practice has engaged with ideas concerning Bangladesh War of Liberation, birds, human face, human figure and natural objects, binding together personal experiences and historical references. Majority of Khan’s sculptures are made of bronze and steel. He also worked with stone, aluminum, white granite, marble and mixed-media. His large-scale sculptures are mostly made of concrete and bronze. Though majority of his early sculptures were built in the expressionist style, his works after 2000 reflect minimalism with constant exploration for purity of forms and material. The composition of his sculptures is characterized by architectural and geometric shapes. The war remembrance theme continued in Khan through 1985 till 1988, in different styles. In the mid-1980s he produced some faces and masks that depicted the tortured faces of the Bengali women.
His watercolor and acrylic paintings predominantly delineate landscape and natural elements, in particular, wetlands, birds, rural panorama, greenery, cloudy sky, deep forest and hills. Many of his paintings bear sculptural attributes.

Personal life
Hamiduzzaman Khan married Ivy Zaman in 1976. Ivy Zaman graduated in sculpture from the Faculty of Fine Arts, University of Dhaka. She is an artist and sculptor by profession. They have two sons, Zubair Zaman Khan Copper and Zarif Hamiduzzaman.

Exhibitions

Solo
 An Indigenous Minimalist, Bengal Gallery of Fine Art, Dhaka, Bangladesh, (2002).
 Homage to Matter, The British Council, Dhaka, Bangladesh, (2006).
 Recent Sculpture and Other Works, Galleri Kaya, Dhaka, Bangladesh, (2006).
 The Intimate World of Colour, Gallery of Fine Art, Asiatic Society of Bangladesh, Dhaka, Bangladesh, (2008).
 Nocturnal Shades, Bengal Gallery of Fine Arts, Dhaka, Bangladesh, (2010).
 Time and Beyond, Galleri Kaya, Dhaka, Bangladesh, (2010).
 Watercolours & Sculptures, Galleri Kaya, Dhaka, Bangladesh, (2012).
 Earthly Treasures, Athena Gallery, Dhaka, Bangladesh, (2014).
 Stones, Galleri Kaya, Dhaka, Bangladesh, (2014).
 Stones-2, Galleri Kaya, Dhaka, Bangladesh, (2016).
 Of Watercolours, Boats and Faces, Shilpangan Gallery, Dhaka, Bangladesh, (2016).
 Jiban Annashane, Institute of Architects Bangladesh, Dhaka, Bangladesh, (2017).
 Hamiduzzaman Khan Retrospective, Nalinikanta Bhattashali Gallery, Bangladesh National Museum, Dhaka, Bangladesh, (2017).
 Nocurnal Shades, Abinta Gallery of Fine Arts, Dhaka, Bangladesh, (2018).
 Display of Early Watercolours by Hamiduzzaman Khan, Galleri Kaya, Dhaka, Bangladesh, (2018).
 Feeling the Void, Dwip Gallery, Dhaka, Bangladesh, (2019).

Group
 World Invitational Open-air Sculpture Exhibition, Seoul Olympic Park, Seoul, Republic of Korea, (1988).
 Soft Reflections, Gallery Cosmos, Dhaka, Bangladesh, (2015).
 Manobotar Pokkhe Sahingsotar Biruddhe Chitrakarma, Gallery Cosmos, Dhaka, Bangladesh, (2015).
 11th Anniversary Exhibition by Galleri Kaya, Galleri Kaya, Dhaka, Bangladesh, (2015).
 Brave Heart, Gallery Cosmos, Dhaka, Bangladesh, (2015).
 13th Anniversary Exhibition by Galleri Kaya, Galleri Kaya, Dhaka, Bangladesh, (2017).
 Jolokabbo, Edge Gallery, Dhaka, Bangladesh, (2017).
 Contemporary and Modern Art of Bangladesh, Galleri Kaya, Dhaka, Bangladesh, (2017).
 Fourth National Sculpture Exhibition, Bangladesh Shilpakala Academy, Dhaka, Bangladesh, (2018).
 14th Anniversary Exhibition by Galleri Kaya, Galleri Kaya, Dhaka, Bangladesh, (2018).
 Still Life 2018, Gallery Chitrak, Dhaka, Bangladesh, (2018).
 Bangladesh-Nepal Friendship Fine Arts Exhibition-2018, Park Gallery, Lalitpur, Nepal (2018).  
 Soaked in Paper, Galleri Kaya, Dhaka, Bangladesh, (2019).
 Festival of Fine Art, Zainul Gallery, Faculty of Fine Arts, University of Dhaka, Dhaka, Bangladesh, (2019).
 15th Anniversary Exhibition by Galleri Kaya, Galleri Kaya, Dhaka, Bangladesh, (2019).
 Prologue 01, Dhaka Gallery, Dhaka, Bangladesh, (2019).
 Group Watercolour Exhibition,  Zainul Gallery, Faculty of Fine Arts, University of Dhaka, Dhaka, Bangladesh, (2020).

Awards
 Best Sculptor's Award by Bangladesh Shilpakala Academy, (1976).
 Best Award in the Life Oriented Art Exhibition, Bangladesh Shilpakala Academy, (1976).
 Prime Minister's Award for contribution in the beautification of Dhaka city, (2006).
 Ekushey Padak, for contribution in sculpture, (2006).
 SM Sultan Gold Medal, by Bangladesh Shilpakala Academy, (2012).
 Zainul Honour 2019, by Faculty of Fine Arts, University of Dhaka, (2019).

Gallery

References 

1946 births
Living people
University of Dhaka Faculty of Fine Arts alumni
Bangladeshi sculptors
Recipients of the Ekushey Padak
Academic staff of the University of Dhaka